The Super-Sex is a 1922 American silent comedy film directed by Lambert Hillyer and starring Robert Gordon, Charlotte Pierce and Tully Marshall.

Cast
 Robert Gordon as Miles Brewster Higgins
 Charlotte Pierce as 	Irene Hayes
 Tully Marshall as Mr. Higgins
 Lydia Knott as 	Mrs. Higgins
 Gertrude Claire as Grandma Brewster
 Albert MacQuarrie as 	Cousin Roy
 Louis Natheaux as 	J. Gordon Davis
 George Bunny as 	Mr. Hayes
 Evelyn Burns as 	Mrs. Hayes

References

Bibliography
 Connelly, Robert B. The Silents: Silent Feature Films, 1910-36, Volume 40, Issue 2. December Press, 1998.
 Munden, Kenneth White. The American Film Institute Catalog of Motion Pictures Produced in the United States, Part 1. University of California Press, 1997.

External links
 

1922 films
1922 comedy films
1920s English-language films
American silent feature films
Silent American comedy films
American black-and-white films
Films directed by Lambert Hillyer
1920s American films